Prunus havardii, called Havard's wild almond or Havard's plum, is a rare North American species of shrub tree native to western Texas in the United States and to northern Chihuahua across the Río Grande in Mexico. It is in the genus Prunus in the rose family, Rosaceae.

It has white flowers and stiff spiny branches.

Notes

References

havardii
Plants described in 1913
Flora of Texas
Flora of Chihuahua (state)